L-proline,2-oxoglutarate:oxygen oxidoreductase may refer to:

 Procollagen-proline 3-dioxygenase
 Procollagen-proline dioxygenase
 Proline 3-hydroxylase